Ann Killough (born 1947) is an American poet. She is author of Beloved Idea (Alice James Books, 2007) which won the 2008 L. L. Winship/PEN New England Award, and Sinners in the Hands: Selections from the Catalog, which received the 2003 Robert Phillips Poetry Chapbook Prize from Texas Review Press. She has had her poems published in literary journals and magazines including Fence, Field, Mudfish, Salamander, and Poet Lore. She grew up in North Carolina and makes her home in Brookline, Massachusetts, where she is one of the coordinators of the Brookline Poetry Series and of the Mouthful Reading Series in Cambridge. She is also a member of the Alice James Books Cooperative Board.

Honors and awards
 2008 L.L. Winship/PEN New England Award, Beloved Idea
 2006 Kinereth Gensler Award

References

External links
 Ann Killough Author Page > Texas A & M University Press
 Ann Killough Author Page > Alice James Books
 Poem: Ann Killough Author Page > Sample Poem

1947 births
Living people
Poets from Massachusetts
Poets from North Carolina
People from Brookline, Massachusetts
American women poets
21st-century American women